JWH-167 (1-pentyl-3-(phenylacetyl)indole) is a synthetic cannabinoid from the phenylacetylindole family, which acts as a cannabinoid agonist with about 1.75 times selectivity for CB1 with a Ki of 90 nM ± 17 and 159 nM ± 14 at CB2. Similar to the related 2'-methoxy compound JWH-250, and the 2'-chloro compound JWH-203, JWH-167 has a phenylacetyl group in place of the naphthoyl ring used in most aminoalkylindole cannabinoid compounds.

In the United States, CB1 receptor agonists of the 3-phenylacetylindole class such as JWH-167 are Schedule I Controlled Substances.

References 

JWH cannabinoids
Phenylacetylindoles
Designer drugs
CB1 receptor agonists
CB2 receptor agonists